Unión Deportiva Montijo is a football team based in Montijo, Extremadura. Founded in 1922, Montijo competes in the Segunda División RFEF – Group 4. The club plays home matches at the Estadio Municipal Emilio Macarro Rodríguez.

Season to season

1 season in Segunda División RFEF
25 seasons in Tercera División

References

External links
 
Soccerway team profile

Football clubs in Extremadura
Association football clubs established in 1922
1922 establishments in Spain
Province of Badajoz